Pinar del Río is one of the provinces of Cuba.  It is at the western end of the island of Cuba.

Geography
The Pinar del Río province is Cuba's westernmost province and contains one of Cuba's three main mountain ranges, the Cordillera de Guaniguanico, divided into the easterly Sierra del Rosario and the westerly Sierra de los Órganos. These form a landscape characterised by steep sided limestone hills (called mogotes) and flat, fertile valleys. One such topographic feature, the Viñales Valley, is a UNESCO World Heritage Site.

The northern coast opens to the great Gulf of Mexico, and is lined by the Colorados Archipelago, a string of cays and isles developed on a reef barrier. The westernmost point of Cuba, Cabo San Antonio, is located on the Guanahacabibes Peninsula, which is a National Park and a Biosphere Reserve.

History
The city was founded by the Spanish as Nueva Filipinas (New Philippines), and the city was renamed Pinar del Río in 1774. The province was founded in 1879.

In 1851 the filibustering Lopez Expedition landed in the province in an effort to seize control of the island, but were defeated by the Spanish Army and their leaders executed.

Economy
The province relies on tobacco farming, with Pinar del Río producing 70% of Cuba's crop, use to make the cigars that are so prized overseas. The best tobacco, used for more expensive cigar brands, is grown in the flat lands of San Juan y Martínez.

Tourism

Tourism is also an important part of the province's economy. Though the town of Pinar del Río (the provincial capital) has some places of cultural and historical interest (such as the Cathedral of San Rosendo, a 19th-century construction), most attractions are to be found in rural or natural settings. A major destination is the Viñales Valley, a karstic depression located in the Sierra de los Organos, north of the town of Viñales. Designated a World Heritage Site by UNESCO in 1999 because of its natural beauty and the traditional agricultural techniques which continue to be used in the cultivation of tobacco and other crops there, the valley is a popular hiking and rock climbing location.

Many of the valley's surrounding hills are dotted with caves which may be explored by visitors and spelunking has become another popular activity in the province (a particularly interesting cave is the Cueva de los Portales, beside the Río Caiguanabo, where Che Guevara set up his staff headquarters and dormitory as commander of the Western Army during the Cuban Missile Crisis).

Accommodations in and near Viñales have also grown in number in response to growing tourism in the region. In addition to casas particulares (licensed bed and breakfasts in private residences), there are a number of hotels some kilometers from the town, such as "La Ermita" and Rancho Horizontes San Vicente.

Another major tourist destination in the province was Las Terrazas, a unique model village located 20 kilometer northeast of Soroa and, from 2011, part of the new Artemisa Province. Surrounded by mountains, the village was founded in 1971 as part of rural development and reforestation project which spans . As in other parts of the province, there are several hiking trails which weave through the surrounding mountains. Some companies offer guided hiking tours on a daily basis (in some areas, in fact, a guide is mandatory).

With around 30 diving sites, Pinar del Río is also considered one of Cuba's premier scuba diving destinations. Cayo Levisa, about two kilometers offshore, is known for its copious black coral and excursions to this cay are afforded by tour agencies based in the province.

An increasing number of tourists also visit the San Diego hot springs, in search of the health benefits reportedly afforded by the warm sulfur-rich waters there. An additional spectrum of health-related services has also become available at this spa, including massages and mud baths.

Municipalities 

Source: Population from 2004 Census. Area from 1976 municipal re-distribution.

Until 2011 the municipalities of Bahía Honda, Candelaria and San Cristóbal were part of the province. After the split of La Habana Province into the new provinces of Artemisa and Mayabeque, the three municipios joined Artemisa.

Notable people 

 Omar Ajete – baseball player
 Randy Arozarena – baseball player
 Eulogio Cantillo - Cuban Army General
 Luis Giraldo Casanova – baseball player
 Juan Castro – baseball player
 Willy Chirino – singer/songwriter
 José Contreras – baseball player
 Marlenis Costa – volleyball player
 Silvia Costa – high jumper
 Frank Delgado – singer/songwriter
 Emeterio González – javelin thrower
 Ariel Hernández – boxer
 Enrique Jorrín- singer/songwriter
 Pedro Luis Lazo – baseball player
 Juan Carlos Lemus – boxer
 Omar Linares – baseball player
 Mijaín López – wrestler
 Polo Montañez – singer/songwriter
 Pedro Pablo Oliva – painter
 Tony Oliva - baseball player
 Pedro Pablo Pérez – cyclist
 Rudy Pérez – composer
 Ioamnet Quintero – high jumper
 Alexei Ramírez – baseball player
 Alejandro Robaina – famed tobacco grower
 Pablo Romero – boxer

Demographics
In 2010, the province of Pinar del Río had a population of 592,042.

References

External links

Pinar.cu

 
Provinces of Cuba